Giouvetsi, yiouvetsi, or youvetsi (from Turkish ) is a Greek dish made with chicken, lamb or beef and pasta, either kritharaki (orzo) or hilopites (small square noodles), and tomato sauce (usually spiced with allspice and sometimes cinnamon, cloves or bay leaves). Other common ingredients include onions/shallots, garlic, beef stock, and red wine. It is characteristically baked in a clay pot, a güveç, and served with grated cheese.

Paula Wolfert called it "one of the most famous of all Greek Island lamb dishes."

See also

Ghivetch, a Balkan food
 List of pasta dishes

References

External links
 Recipe (in Greek)

Greek cuisine
Meat dishes
Pasta dishes
Casserole dishes
Stews